Michaela Holanová (born 4 February 1990) is a Czech handballer for DHK Baník Most and the Czech national team.

She participated at the 2021 World Women's Handball Championship in Spain, placing 19th.

Achievements
Czech First Division:
Winner: 2012, 2014, 2015, 2016, 2017, 2018, 2019, 2021

References

External links

1990 births
Living people
Sportspeople from Písek
Czech female handball players